Penthu was an Egyptian noble who bore the titles of sealbearer of the King of Lower Egypt, the sole companion, the attendant of the Lord of the Two Lands, the favorite of the good god, king's scribe, the king's subordinate, First servant of the Aten in the mansion of the Aten in Akhetaten, Chief of physicians, and chamberlain. These titles alone show how powerful he would have been in Eighteenth Dynasty Egypt.

He was originally Chief Physician to Akhenaten, but may have survived the upheavals of the end of the Amarna Period, and served under Ay, after being Vizier under Tutankhamun. The identification of Penthu the Physician with Pentu the Vizier is not certain, however.
He had a tomb constructed at Amarna, Amarna Tomb 5, although his remains have never been identified, and he was probably never buried there.

An inscription discovered in 2012 in the Dayr Abū Ḥinnis limestone quarry dated to Year 16, 3rd month of  Akhet, day 15 of the reign of Akhenaten records that quarrying was being undertaken for building work on the Small Aten Temple under the authority of the king's scribe Penthu. The Penthu mentioned in the inscription is presumably the same Penthu who was the owner of Amarna Tomb 5. Due his position as a chief priest within the Aten priesthood, it is unlikely to be a coincidence that he would have been placed in charge of quarrying stone for this temple.

See also
 List of ancient Egyptian scribes

References

External links
 El Amarna North Tombs

14th-century BC Egyptian people
Ancient Egyptian scribes
Ancient Egyptian physicians